"Pretty Little Ditty" is an instrumental track by the American rock band Red Hot Chili Peppers, from their 1989 album Mother's Milk. Recognized as one of the best examples of the eclecticism the band experimented with in this album, the song was written by guitarist John Frusciante and bassist Flea.

It is one of the few songs on the album not to feature any guitar layering; music journalist Jeff Apter defined the song "a dreamy, sweetly stoned instrumental featured deft picking and strumming from Frusciante, intertwined with blasts of trumpet from Flea".

Impact and legacy
In 1999, part of the second segment of the song was sampled by rap rock band Crazy Town for their single "Butterfly", featuring additional lyrics by the members of the band. The single sold 6 million copies worldwide.

The song was also sampled on the August 2020 track "Ain't It Different" by British rappers Headie One, AJ Tracey and Stormzy.

References

Red Hot Chili Peppers songs
1989 songs
Rock instrumentals
Song recordings produced by Michael Beinhorn